The 2014 West Midlands Police and Crime Commissioner by-election was a by-election for the position of Police and Crime Commissioner in the West Midlands Police region of the United Kingdom, held on 21 August 2014. It was triggered by the death of Bob Jones, the inaugural West Midlands Police and Crime Commissioner, who died on 1 July 2014.

The election had to be held with 35 working days of the vacancy by virtue of Section 51 of the Police Reform and Social Responsibility Act 2011. On 4 July 2014, Birmingham City Council, who oversaw the election, confirmed that the poll would be held on 21 August 2014.

Candidates
On 25 July 2014, Birmingham City Council published the statement of persons nominated, which confirmed that four people had been validly nominated to stand:

 David Jamieson (Labour), former member of Solihull Metropolitan Borough Council and former MP for Plymouth Devonport
 Les Jones (Conservative), member of and former leader of Dudley Metropolitan Borough Council
 Ayoub Khan (Liberal Democrat) barrister and former member of Birmingham City Council
 Keith Rowe (UKIP), businessman

Results
Jamieson won the election with 50.83% of first preference votes on a turnout of 10.38%. Turnout ranged between 9.78% in Sandwell to 11.58% in Solihull. Alexandra Runswick, director of the pressure group Unlock Democracy, said that "few voters knew that the election was happening and even fewer cared". The previous lowest turnout for a large-scale by-election in the United Kingdom since the Second World War was 18.2%, in the 2012 Manchester Central by-election.

Previous result

References

2014 elections in the United Kingdom
Police and crime commissioner elections
2014 in England
West Midlands Police
2010s in the West Midlands (county)